Edwin Alan Shirley (November 17, 1937 – August 20, 2004) was an American politician in the state of Iowa.

Mogged was born in Perry, Iowa. He attended Drake University and is a lawyer. He served in the Iowa State Senate from 1965 to 1971 as a Democrat.

References

1937 births
2004 deaths
Drake University Law School alumni
Iowa lawyers
Democratic Party Iowa state senators
People from Perry, Iowa